The 2023 Berlin Thunder season is the third season of the Berlin Thunder team in the European League of Football.

Preseason
After missing the play-offs in the last game of 2022, the franchise extended the contracts of head coach Johnny Schmuck and defensive coordinator Christopher Kuhfeldt. The first roster move of the season was resigning team and league defensive player of the 2022 season Kyle Kitchens. Homegrown talent Max Zimmermann was the first new signing for the Berlin Thunder.

Regular season

Standings

Roster

Staff

Notes

References 

Berlin Thunder (ELF)
Berlin Thunder
Berlin Thunder